The 21st Pau Grand Prix was a non-Championship motor race, run to Formula One rules, held on 3 April 1961 at Pau Circuit, the street circuit in Pau. The race was run over 100 laps of the circuit, and was won by Jim Clark in a Lotus 18. This was Clark's first Formula One victory.

The cars entered by Scuderia Centro Sud were fitted with engines that were bigger than the 1.5 litres allowed by the regulations. Lorenzo Bandini had a 2.5-litre engine, and Mário Cabral a 2-litre.

Results

References

 "The Formula One Record Book", John Thompson, 1974.
 Results at www.silhouet.com

External links
Full results details at formula2.net

Pau Grand Prix
Pau Grand Prix
1961 in French motorsport